Thirsk and Malton is a constituency in North Yorkshire represented in the House of Commons of the UK Parliament since 2015 by Kevin Hollinrake, a Conservative.

History

2010-date
Anne McIntosh, a Conservative, elected for Vale of York in 1997 then in Thirsk and Malton in 2010, having defeated fellow MP John Greenway in the selection, qualified as an advocate and worked for six years as political adviser to the European Democrats group in Brussels, then won election as an MEP for two terms, since 2010 she chaired the Environment, Food and Rural Affairs Select Committee. In 2014 she was deselected as the Conservative candidate. In 2015, Kevin Hollinrake was elected as MP.

Political history
Traditionally a safe Conservative seat, the main forerunner, Ryedale (abolished in 2010) was taken by Elizabeth Shields for the Liberal Party, following a by-election in 1986, held following the death of MP John Spence, and she held it for one year until the 1987 general election.

Thirsk and Malton had been the name for a previous constituency between 1885 and 1983.

Boundaries

The District of Ryedale, the District of Hambleton wards of Easingwold, Helperby, Huby and Sutton, Shipton, Sowerby, Stillington, Thirsk, Thorntons, Tollerton, Topcliffe, White Horse, and Whitestonecliffe, and the Borough of Scarborough wards of Filey and Hertford.

Constituency profile
The seat also includes Pickering and most of the North York Moors (its southern part), a mixed rugged crags and hillside National Park; its coastline in the seat at Filey is where the Moors meets the sea, with picturesque bays near to Scarborough.
Electoral Calculus describes the seat as "Strong Right", characterised by support for socially conservative values and Brexit.

Members of Parliament

Elections

Elections in the 2010s

 

In January 2014, Conservative Anne McIntosh — the MP at the time — was not re-selected by the local party. McIntosh originally announced she would stand as an independent, but withdrew in March 2015.

Thirsk and Malton was originally scheduled to be contested for the first time at the general election on 6 May 2010. However, the death of UKIP candidate John Boakes from a suspected heart attack, announced on 22 April 2010, caused the poll in the constituency to be postponed until 27 May 2010. Under the Electoral Administration Act, UKIP were allowed to select a replacement candidate, but new nominations by other parties were not permitted. The constituent parties of the Conservative – Liberal Democrat coalition government formed in the aftermath of the general election fielded competing candidates.

See also
List of parliamentary constituencies in North Yorkshire

References

External links
Thirsk and Malton Conservatives
Thirsk and Malton Liberal Democrats
Thirsk and Malton Liberals
Thirsk and Malton Labour Party

Parliamentary constituencies in Yorkshire and the Humber
Constituencies of the Parliament of the United Kingdom established in 2010
Politics of North Yorkshire
Ryedale
Politics of the Borough of Scarborough
Hambleton District